Borjak may refer to:

 Barjak, Hamadan
 Barjak, Kerman
 Borjak-e Hasan, Kerman Province
 Borjak-e Seyfollah, Kerman Province
 Borjak, Markazi
 Borjak, Bardaskan, Razavi Khorasan Province
 Borjak-e Naqdali, Razavi Khorasan Province
 Borjak-e Sheykhi, Razavi Khorasan Province
 Borjak, alternate name of Bijvard, Razavi Khorasan Province

See also
 Borjaki, Hamadan Province, Iran
 Barjak (disambiguation)